Stade Municipal du Ray was a football stadium in Nice, France. It was the home of OGC Nice since it opened in 1927 and had a capacity of 17,415. It was popular for being located in the center of the city, but suffered from its old structure and small capacity.
The red and black colored stadium was mostly used for football. A new stadium was supposed to be built in the Lingostière side, but the project was cancelled in 2006. The stadium was replaced by the Allianz Riviera in September 2013.

References

External links

Ray
OGC Nice
Sports venues in Nice
Sports venues completed in 1927